Perfect Mismatch (formerly known as It's a Mismatch) is a Bollywood film directed by Ajmal Zaheer Ahmad.

Plot summary
Mr. Bhalla (Anupam Kher) is a Punjabi living in United States with his wife, daughter and nephew Aman (Anubhav Anand). Aman is in love with Neha (Nandana Sen), daughter of Mr. Patel (Boman Irani), a conventional Gujarati. Although the two are in love, their families have huge differences due to drastically different lifestyles. In the end, it's up to Aman and Neha to not only bring their families together but to live up to their expectations.

Cast
 Anubhav Anand as Aman Bhalla
 Nandana Sen as Neha Patel
 Anupam Kher as Sukhwinder Bhalla
 Boman Irani as Dinesh Patel
 Sheel Gupta as  Preeti Bhalla
 Geeta Sugandh as  Mrs. Shah
 Kanaiya Sugandh as  Mr. Shah
 Osman Soykut as  Mr. Brenner
 Rashmi Rustagi as Meena Patel

Release
Perfect Mismatch was produced under the banner Xperience Films and had a limited release in India. The film was originally titled It's A Mismatch, but the producers had to change to title as it was not available. The film was released contemporaneously with another Bollywood film, Luck, which adversely affected its ticket sales.  Perfect Mismatch didn't perform well at the box office in India, but had a successful festival run in the United States. It was an official selection at one of the top 10 International Film Festivals - Cinequest Film Festival.  The original songs for the soundtrack were composed by the Montreal-based group, Josh.

References

External links
 

2000s Hindi-language films
2009 films
2000s English-language films